

The Taylors Creek Trail is a shared use path for cyclists and pedestrians, which follows Taylors Creek in the outer north-west suburb of Taylors Lakes in Melbourne, Victoria, Australia.

Combined with the Maribyrnong River Trail this trail makes for a good trip into the Melbourne city centre.

Following the Path
The path starts about 300m south of Melton Highway and Kings Road intersection adjacent to Watergardens Shopping Centre, not far from Watergardens (a.k.a. Sydenham) station. Following the path is straightforward. When heading east from Watergardens Shopping Centre, change from the south side of the creek to the north side of the creek at Sunshine Avenue. Stay on the north side thereafter.

Enjoy the remnant vegetation to be found along the creek bank and follow the instructions below to arrive at the Maribyrnong River Trail.

In 2010 the trail was extended from Burrowye Crescent deep into the Taylors Creek valley. The trail along the valley is very rough but contains a great display of remnant vegetation including native grasses. Riders can exit the valley via an extremely steep dirt track on the east side of the creek leading up to Green Gully Road and Brimbank Park. This route should only be considered during dry conditions.

Connections
Dead end in the west at Kings Road. Dead end in the east at Burrowye Crescent - i.e. excluding the valley floor route.

A 3 km road section connects with the Maribyrnong River Trail towards the south east. At the east end of the Taylors Creek trail at Burrowye Crescent turn left. Follow Burrowye for approx 1/2 a kilometre until you reach the Old Calder Highway, turn to the right south east towards the city. Using the service road on Old Calder Highway's south side, head south east towards Green Gully Road. Remain on the Old Calder Hwy going down the hill past the Library on you RH side and the Village shopping centre on your left. Past the local Keilor Park on your right and the old historic Keilor Pub on your left, ride on another 100 or so metres. You have two choices at this point?

Option one - Ride on till you reach Bonfield Street then turn right and go up the hill. Be sure to check out the historical marker at the top of the hill. Turn left into Horseshoe Bend Road, then turn right into Garden Avenue and into the rear of Brimbank Park and onto the unsealed trail through to the Maribyrnong River Trail.

Option two - Continue to follow the Old Calder Hwy over the traffic bridge then slip inside the fence and onto the bike and walking trail that proceeds around the northern edge of Brimbank Park. Then follow the various signs that will guide you to several bike trails including Maribyrnong River Trail.

References 

Bike paths in Melbourne